Zenith Star was a Directed-energy weapon that started development as part of the US Strategic Defense Initiative.

It included the Alpha laser, a high energy hydrogen fluoride chemical laser, and the LAMP mirror which was a 7 segment adaptive optics mirror.

Zenith Star was never put in orbit, but the Alpha LAMP Integration (ALI) project carried out some ground-based tests.

History

Legacy 
Around 1998 Space-Based lasers were reconsidered and led to the SBL-IFX project.

See also

References

Further reading
Zenith Star Experiment to Test Laser Weapon in Space 1989

Directed-energy weapons
Energy weapons